God's Own Country is a phrase meaning an area or region supposedly favoured by God.

God's Own Country may also refer to:
 God's Own Country (2014 film), a Malayalam movie
 God's Own Country (2017 film), a British drama

See also

 God's own county, a nickname for Yorkshire, England
 God's Country (disambiguation)